Paul Marsden is a fictional character from the British television soap opera Emmerdale, played by Matthew Booth. The character made his first appearance during the episode broadcast on 10 March 2003. The character was killed off in July 2004, following an altercation with Carl King (Tom Lister).

Development
After they had been on-screen for six months, Emmerdale producer Steve Frost decided to axe the majority of the Marsden family. Frost decided to keep Paul and Siobhan in the series but Ronnie, Frances, Alistair and Elaine would all depart the series in December 2003. Of his decision, Frost stated "The Marsdens have got a great story to play through the autumn, but unfortunately this culminates in them leaving the village." On his plans for the remaining characters he added that "Paul and Siobhan Marsden will be staying on and the young couple have got some trying times ahead."

Both remained in the show until 2004, when his character was killed off. The story featured Carl King (Tom Lister) accidentally causing Paul's death.

Storylines
When Paul and his family arrive in the village, Paul initially works as a porter, alongside his nurse wife Siobhan. Paul actually wants to be a carpenter, and does some jobs with Syd Woolfe (Nathan Gladwell), but he finally finds a full-time job at the post office, beating Marlon Dingle (Mark Charnock) to the role.

When Paul's family move away, Siobhan and Paul stay in Victoria Cottage. They seem to have many happy years ahead, but tragedy occurs when Paul attempts to fix a roof with Carl. They get into a fight the day before over a package Carl had not wanted Paul to deliver. They reconcile and get onto the roof. Paul jokingly throws some tools to Carl. Carl throws some back, but when Paul tries to catch them, he falls off the roof. Carl calls his brothers, who move Paul's corpse to his garden. Siobhan finds him and cradled his lifeless body in her arms. No one ever discovers the truth about Paul's death. After his death, Siobhan discovers that she is pregnant.

References

Emmerdale characters
Fictional British postal workers
Male characters in television